Fria is a prefecture located in the Boké Region of Guinea. The capital is Fria. The prefecture covers an area of .² and has a population of 96,527. It is the site of the first alumina factory in Africa.

Sub-prefectures
The prefecture is divided administratively into 4 sub-prefectures:
 Fria-Centre
 Baguinet
 Banguingny
 Tormelin

References 

Prefectures of Guinea
Boké Region